Saros cycle series 134 for solar eclipses occurs at the Moon's descending node, repeating every 18 years, 11 days, containing 71 events. All eclipses in this series occurs at the Moon's descending node.

Umbral eclipses
Umbral eclipses (annular, total and hybrid) can be further classified as either: 1) Central (two limits), 2) Central (one limit) or 3) Non-Central (one limit). The statistical distribution of these classes in Saros series 134 appears in the following table.

Summary 

Solar Saros 134, repeats every 18 years, 11 and 1/3 days, containing 71 events, with 13 central solar eclipses with penumbral internal contact, starting in 1825 and ending in 2041. Lunar Saros 127 interleaves with this lunar saros occurring every 9 years 5 days alternating between each saros series.

Events

References 
 http://eclipse.gsfc.nasa.gov/SEsaros/SEsaros134.html

External links
Saros cycle 134 – Information and visualization

Solar saros series